The University of Nueva Caceres also referred to by its acronym UNC is a private non-sectarian basic and higher education institution in Naga City, Bicol Region, Philippines. It is the oldest and the first university in southern Luzon. Founded by Dr. Bert Baldo Parado in 1948, it offers pre-school, elementary, junior high school, senior high school, undergraduate, and graduate programs.

All course offerings are recognized by the government and the Colleges of Arts and Sciences, Education, and Business and Accountancy are accredited by the Philippine Association of Colleges and Universities Commission on Accreditation (PACU-COA).

History 
In February 1948, Don Jaime Hernandez Sr. invited prominent Bicolanos to join him as incorporators of a planned new school. The incorporation papers were signed on May 9, 1948, by Hernandez himself, Jaime Reyes, Jose T. Fuentebella, Edmundo Cea, Atty. Buenaventura Blancaflor, Nicole Tado Sr., Juan F. Trivino, Antonio M. Sison, Manuel Abella, and Domingo Abella, among others. The Securities and Exchange Commission approved the incorporators on May 18, 1948.

The school officially started operation on July 1, 1948, as the Nueva Caceres Colleges. The initial courses offered were Liberal Arts, Commerce, Education and high school with a total enrollment of 958. The students of the newly opened school had their classes in the rented Flordeliza Building fronting the public kiosk (now Plaza Quezon) and the Governor Andres Hernandez residence along Burgos Street (now Grand Imperial Plaza).

In the ensuing years, additional courses were opened: elementary (1949), graduate school (1953), law (1951), engineering (1949), nursing (defunct 1955–2005), secretarial (1955) and kindergarten (1993).

In September 1951, the university administration acquired the Rey property and transformed it from a marshland to its present condition. By early 1952 almost half of the site was filled and buildings began to rise. Bishop Pedro P. Santos blessed the new campus and the first two buildings, the original Dato Hall and Alba Hall on July 11, 1952. Other buildings were soon built to address the needs of a growing student population. Under the leadership of university president Dolores H. Sison, there is an ongoing multi-million infrastructure program to further modernize the institution.

On July 30, 2018, Fay Lea Patria M. Lauraya was appointed as the fourth president of the university. According to Alfredo I. Ayala, UNC is fortunate to have Lauraya as the new president. Dr. Lauraya is an accomplished and proven leader who has a track record of engaging with and empowering both staff and students, introducing innovative new programs, and investing in employee development and a merit based promotion system.

Ayala Education, Inc 
On July 28, 2015, the AYALA Group raised its stake in the Philippine education sector by investing ₱450 million to acquire 60 percent of University of Nueva Caceres. As a result of this investment, Ayala Education will hold the majority of UNC's board seats. In addition, UNC appointed Ayala Education's CEO, Alfredo Ayala, as the president of the board of trustees.

Organization and administration

Presidents 
Jaime Hernandez (May 18, 1948 – )
Dolores H. Sison
Alfredo I. Ayala (July 28, 2015 – July 29, 2018)
Fay Lea Patria M. Lauraya (July 30, 2018 – present)

Board of trustees
 President – Alfredo I. Ayala

Trustees:
 Carlos H. Ravanera
 Rosalie A. Dimaano
 Felipe P. Estrella III
 Eleanor S. Salumbre
 Charlene C. Tapic-Castro

UNC Greyhounds
The University of Nueva Caceres has chosen the "Greyhound" as the mascot of the school.

Academics

College of Computer Studies
The College of Computer Studies was established when the population of Computer Science majors (formerly belonging to the College of Arts and Sciences) grew in size. It was formerly known as the College of Information Technology. This eventually changed in 2003 when the college added two new four-year courses: Bachelor of Science in Information Technology and Bachelor of Science in Information Management.

The college offers courses that give students an opportunity to specialize in computers, while becoming exposed to a variety of liberal arts courses. Three degrees of concentration are available: Bachelor of Science in Computer Science (BSCS), Bachelor of Science in Information Technology (BSIT) and Bachelor of Science in Information Management (BSIM). Certificate courses are available for students who choose to focus on acquiring computer skills. These are two-year courses in Associate in Computer Technology (ACT), Computer Technician (CT), and Network Technician (NT).

LINC Senior High School
LINC, or Learning with Industry Collaboration, is the Senior High School Academic Program at the University of Nueva Caceres.

Publications
The Democrat – The independent student publication of the University of Nueva Caceres
The Pantograph – The official student publication of the UNC Senior High School Department
The Trailblazer – The official student publication of the UNC Junior High School Department
Citrus – The official publication of the college 
Literati – The official publication of the College of Arts and Sciences
Sed Vitae – Published once a year by the Research Center of the University of Nueva Caceres
The A-Venue – The official UNC GS student-faculty publication
The Torch –  The official student publication of the UNC College of Education
The Perspective –  The official student publication of UNC College of Engineering and Architecture
Tycoon – The official publication of the College of Business and Accountancy
The Children's World – The official publication of the Elementary Department
Red and Gray – The annual pictorial review published by the graduating students at the end of the school year

Community extension
The University of Nueva Caceres – Institutionalized Community Extension Services (UNC – ICES) is the central office and coordinating center of the university for its Extension Service Program. It serves as the institutional coordinating arm of various departments, colleges and student organizations’ community services. The office initiates and co-implements projects and programs and identify departments who will be the lead implementer based on their line of interest and expertise. It assists, advises, monitors and evaluates the Extension Program of the university or specific department as it ties up with offices like the Research Center, DSA, VPSEA, Deans and Principals, and the Local Government Units (LGUs), Government Line Agencies, NGOs and POs.

ICES ensures that students, faculty members and non-teaching personnel of the university are provided with opportunities to get involved in various extension activities or program either institutionally or departmentally initiated and implemented. Once in a while alumni and UNC partners like Parents – Teachers – Council are tapped to support activities. Students' involvement in Extension is varied. It can be curricular-related (like Social Arts, NSTP – CWTS, Practicum), extra-curricular involvement (like student organizations / fraternities / sororities), or simply volunteerism like (ICES student volunteers, Campus Ministry volunteers, Peer facilitators, College Red Cross Youth). Teaching and non-teaching personnel can participate as resource speakers, lecturers, facilitators, trainer  initiators / organizers of an activity together with identified student organizations or community groups.

Student services

Guidance center 
The guidance center provides services that will facilitate the growth and development of the students so that they will become more effective functional and productive members of the society.

Campus ministry 
The campus ministry coordinates all religious activities within the university, as well as the university's participation in related religious activities outside the campus. It plans and implements various programs geared toward moral and spiritual formation of the students and the entire university population. It encourages and develop student volunteerism for responsible and committed Christian action.

Office of the Director for Student Affairs 
This office is primarily concerned with the coordination and overall development of non-academic areas of student life. It formulates and implements policies, rules and regulation concerning student activities and welfare and provides guidance and assistance to students and planning and organizing their activities.

Speech clinic 
This clinic is equipped with individual booths, tape recorders and earphones which enable the students to follow speech models and also hear their own voices. It trains in pronunciation, enunciation, diction and other nuances of the English language.

Museum 
The University Museum is a pet project of Don Jaime Hernandez, the founder of the University of Nueva Caceres. It started on October 1, 1952, having as one of its primary aims to collect objects of interests in the arts and sciences. The UNC is the second educational institution in the Philippines to have a museum.

The UNC Museum is the first museum in Bicol (October 1, 1952) with the biggest and most varied collection consisting of historical-cultural pictures and documents/realias and models on UNC/Bicol and the country on its four periods of history: the Ancient, the Spanish, the American, and the Republic. A mini-global collection ends the presentation. The temporary exhibit uses the central gallery.

The total number of visitors annually is 10,000 consisting of UNCeans and both local, provincial, regional, national educational tours and international visitors. Admission is free of charge.

The University of Nueva Caceres is the second, private educational institution in the Philippines to have a Museum. When the late President Emeritus Jaime Hernandez founded the Nueva Caceres Colleges, one of his dreams for the future university was the establishment of a school Museum. He wanted to build sanctuary where historical relic, especially those of Bicol might be preserved for posterity, thus on October 1, 1952, the Museum was founded with the late Ignacio Meliton as the first Curator.

Notable alumni
Luis G. Dato – one of the first Filipino romantic poets of the 20th century
Salvador Panelo
Leni Robredo – 14th Former Vice President of the Philippines (College of Law)
Noel Tijam – one of the Associate Justice of the Supreme Court of the Philippines (Elementary and High School Department)

References

External links
University of Nueva Caceres

Universities and colleges in Bicol Region
 
Universities and colleges in Naga, Camarines Sur
Educational institutions established in 1948
High schools in Camarines Sur
Ayala Corporation subsidiaries
Ayala Education
1948 establishments in the Philippines